Ramesh Ganpatrao Bundile is a member of the 13th Maharashtra Legislative Assembly. He represents the Daryapur Assembly Constituency. He belongs to the Bharatiya Janata Party. He is a retired Chief engineer of MSEDCL. He retired in December 2012.

References

Maharashtra MLAs 2014–2019
1952 births
People from Amravati district
Living people
Marathi politicians
Bharatiya Janata Party politicians from Maharashtra